Downtown is the commercial and geographic heart of Agoura Hills, California, a district built mainly in the 1970s to replace the city's old heart in what is now the Historic Quarter.

Downtown features a number of shopping centers, focused on Thousand Oaks Boulevard and Kanan Rd., the area's two main thoroughfares. Although in the past few decades much of the city's entertainment life had moved south to Malibu Junction, leaving a great deal of urban decay behind, there is a current renaissance of entertainment in downtown, fueled by the opening and redesign of a number of restaurants and cafes, as well as the construction boom in the South End.

Downtown is bordered by Upper Downtown to the north, East Agoura to the southeast, South End to the south, Midtown to the southwest, and Morrison Ranch to the northwest.

References 

Neighborhoods in Agoura Hills, California